The 1981–82 British Home Championship between the British Home Nations was won by a dominant England football team which won all three of its matches as the tournament returned after being abandoned in 1981 due to civil disturbances in Northern Ireland. The championship was eagerly awaited because for the first time since 1958, three of the Home Nations were featuring in a World Cup; the 1982 FIFA World Cup in Spain and this was a chance to see them in competitive action before the World Cup began. The end-of-season format that had been used throughout the 1970s was dropped as it was felt three games in eight days was too intense at the end of a season and prior to a World Cup. The English began impressively with a heavy victory over Northern Ireland at home, followed by victory away in Wales. The Scots could only manage a draw with the disappointing Irish by contrast although they did beat Wales. The Welsh managed to salvage a result in their third game with a 3–0 defeat of Northern Ireland to claim third place. In the final deciding match in Glasgow, England edged victory through a Paul Mariner goal and thus claimed the championship. In the World Cup, Scotland were eliminated in the first round whilst England went out in the second round without losing a game. The unfancied Irish however provided a shock by beating hosts Spain and eliminating Yugoslavia in the first round before falling victim to the inspired French in round two.

Table

Results

References

External links
Full Results and Line-ups

1982
1982 in British sport
1981–82 in Northern Ireland association football
1981–82 in Welsh football
1981–82 in English football
1981–82 in Scottish football